Tendinous arch may refer to:
 Tendinous arch of pelvic fascia
 Tendinous arch of levator ani